The 1982 World Sambo Championships were held in Paris, France, in July 1982. Championships were organized by FILA.

Medal overview

External links 
Results on Sambo.net.ua

World Sambo Championships
1982 in sambo (martial art)
International sports competitions hosted by France
Sport in Paris